Kaushiki is a Hindu goddess, a deity who emerged from the sheath of Parvati. She was created before Parvati's conflict with the asura brothers Sumbha and Nisumbha, and was also the reason the Matrikas come into existence. According to the Lakshmi Tantra, Kaushiki is a manifestation of the goddess Lakshmi.

Legends

Puranas
The story of Kaushiki is described in Devi Mahatmyam of Markandeya Purana. The Devi Mahatmyam describes that the goddess Kaushiki appeared from the sheath (or kosha) of the goddess Parvati’s body when the devas sang her praises after she defeated the asuras Sumbha and Nisumbha. Their eulogies that were intended to be a plea for help caused her to manifest from Parvati's form as a fair-skinned and bright being, earning the epithet 'Gauri'. The fact that she had been created from the cells of Parvati caused her to name herself Kaushiki, literally meaning 'woman of the cell'. With the fairness of her skin separated from her form, Parvati became dark-skinned and assumed the name of Kali. The deities went their separate ways, with Kaushiki departing to the Himalayas. The minions of the asura brothers, Chanda and Munda, caught a glimpse of Kaushiki and rushed to urge Sumbha to claim her. With the help of the Matrikas, who were the female forms of the Trimurti, consisting of Brahmani, Vaishnavi, and Maheshwari, along with Varahi, Narasimhi, and Shakti, and her other half, the goddess Chamunda (Kali), Kaushiki and her forces fought the asuras in a pitched battle in order to vanquish them and restore the natural order. Following this, Parvati performed a penance in the Himalayas to restore her shakti and complexion before reuniting with Shiva.

Kalika Purana describes Kaushiki as the shakti that was born from the body of Goddess Matangi. 

Devi Bhagavata Purana describes Kaushiki as the Shakti that came out from the body of Goddess Parvati, and she is called ‘Kaushiki’ in the beginning of Devi Bhagavata Purana.

Pancharatra Agamas
In Lakshmi Tantra, Lakshmi Devi tells Indra that she is the shakti who came out of Gauri as Kaushiki and killed many demons, including Sumbha and Nisumbha.
O Sakra, during the period of Tamasa (Manu), 
I, the supreme Mahavidya, was Kaushiki, who sprang from the body of Gauri 
to slay all those notorious demons including Sumbha and Nisumbha. 
Thereby I rescued the worlds and helped the gods.
O lord of all gods, when worshipped with devotion. 
I, the goddess Kaushiki fulfiller of many desires, bestow omniscience (on the devotee).
– Lakshmi Tantra, Pancharatra Agama

See also
Chamunda
Bhramari
Sumbha and Nisumbha

References

Hindu goddesses
Lakshmi